Inter-State Grocer Company Building, also known as Bagcraft Building, is a historic factory and warehouse located at Joplin, Jasper County, Missouri.  It was built in 1915, and is a five-story fireproof wholesale distribution and food processing building constructed of reinforced concrete with tapestry brick cladding and terra cotta ornamentation. Also on the property is a contributing one-story brick garage (c. 1920). 

It was listed on the National Register of Historic Places in 2008.

The building, now known as the Gryphon Building, was completely renovated in 2010 and is now used as a multi-tenant office space.

References

Industrial buildings and structures on the National Register of Historic Places in Missouri
Industrial buildings completed in 1915
Buildings and structures in Joplin, Missouri
National Register of Historic Places in Jasper County, Missouri
Grocery store buildings